Marshall is an occupation name whose origin is from the Frankish mare ("horse") + skalkoz ("servant").  It is most commonly found as a surname, but may also be used as a given name. It is also an old Scottish surname meaning 'Love of Horses'. It is also an anglicization of the German and Ashkenazic Jewish surname 'Marschall' meaning 'keeper of horses' in German.

People with Marshall as surname
Alan Marshall (disambiguation), multiple people
Alan John (Jock) Marshall (1911–1967), Australian author, academic and ornithologist
Albert Marshall (author) (born 1947), Maltese author and poet
Alex Marshall (disambiguation), multiple people
Alexander Marshall (disambiguation), multiple people
Alfred Marshall (1842–1924), English economist
Arthur Marshall (disambiguation), multiple people
Barry Marshall (born 1951), Australian physician and Nobel Prize winner known for stomach-ulcer research
Ben Marshall (born 1991), English footballer
Benji Marshall (born 1985), New Zealand rugby league player
Bob Marshall (disambiguation), multiple people
Boyd Marshall (1884–1950), American actor 
Brandon Marshall (born 1984), American football player
Cecilia Suyat Marshall (1928–2022), American civil rights activist and historian
 Chad Marshall, known as Rowdy Rebel (born 1991), American rapper
Charles Henry Tilson Marshall (1841–1927), British Army Officer
Cherry Marshall (1923–2006), British fashion model and agent
Cuddles Marshall (1925-2007), American baseball players
Danny Marshall (born 1952), American politician and motor sports driver/team operator
David Marshall (disambiguation), multiple people
Debra Marshall (born 1960), American wrestling manager
Dixie Marshall (born 1963), Australian newsreader
Donny Marshall (born 1972), NBA basketball player
Donyell Marshall (born 1973), NBA basketball player
Elizabeth Marshall (born 1951), Canadian politician
Elizabeth Marshall (cook), English chef and food writer
Elizabeth Marshall (pharmacist) (1768–1836), American businesswoman and pharmacist
E. Pierce Marshall (1939–2006), American businessman and son of J. Howard Marshall
Erin Marshall (born 1987), English wrestler
Ethel Marshall (born 1924), American badminton player
Francis Marshall (disambiguation), multiple people
Frank Marshall (disambiguation), multiple people
Garry Marshall (1934–2016), American actor/director/writer/producer
Gavin Marshall (born 1960), Australian politician
Geoffrey Marshall (disambiguation), multiple people
George Marshall (conservationist) (born 1904), American economist
George C. Marshall (1880–1959), U.S. general, Secretary of State and Nobel Laureate, known for the Marshall Plan
Grant Marshall (born 1973), Canadian ice hockey player
 Grant Marshall, known as Daddy G (born 1959), member of the band Massive Attack
Gregg Marshall (born 1963), American basketball coach
Guy Anstruther Knox Marshall (1871–1959), Indian-born British entomologist
Hannah Marshall (fashion designer) (born 1982), British fashion designer
Hannah Marshall (actress) (born 1984), New Zealand actress
Helen Marshall (historian) (b. 25 October 1898), American historian of nursing
Helen M. Marshall (1929–2017), American politician
Howard Marshall (disambiguation), multiple people
Humphrey Marshall (disambiguation), multiple people
Humphry Marshall (1722–1801), American botanist
Hunter Marshall III (1917–1942), U.S. Navy officer and Silver Star recipient
Ian Marshall (English footballer) (born 1966), English footballer
Ian Marshall (soccer coach) (born 1943), New Zealand national football team coach
Iman Marshall (born 1997), American football player
Jack Marshall (disambiguation), multiple people
Jalin Marshall (born 1995), American football player
James Marshall (disambiguation), multiple people
Jim Marshall (disambiguation), multiple people
John Marshall (disambiguation), multiple people
John Marshall (1755–1835), 4th Chief Justice of the United States
Johnnie Marshall (born 1961), American blues guitarist, songwriter, and singer
Jonathan Marshall (disambiguation), multiple people
Joy Marshall (1867–1903), New Zealand clergyman
Justin Marshall (born 1973), New Zealand rugby union player
Kelly Fyffe-Marshall, Canadian filmmaker
Kris Marshall (born 1973), British actor
Kristal Marshall (born 1983), American model and WWE Diva
Lenore Marshall (1899-1971), American poet, novelist, and activist
Leonard Marshall (born 1961), American football player
Lester Marshall (1902–1956), English footballer
Lewis Marshall (born 1988), New Zealand rugby union player
Liselotte Marshall (1924–2017), German-born Jewish novelist
Lois Marshall (born 1924), Canadian soprano
Louis Marshall (born 1856), American lawyer
Lyndsey Marshal (born 1978), British actress
Mac Marshall (born 1996), American baseball player
Malcolm Marshall (1958–1999), West Indian cricketer
Maria Marshall (born 1966), British artist
Marian Sutton Marshall (1846–1901), English Typist and trade unionist
Mary A. R. Marshall (1921–1992), Virginia politician
Mary Paley Marshall (1850–1944), British economist
Maurice Marshall, New Zealand athlete
Max Marshall (baseball) (1913–1993), American baseball player
Naji Marshall (born 1998), American basketball player
Nelly Nichol Marshall (1845–1898), American author
Patricia Marshall (1924-2018), American actress
Penelope Marshall (born 1989), New Zealand swimmer
Penny Marshall (1943–2018), American actress, producer and director
Philippa Marshall (1920–2005), British Royal Air Force officer
Quavious Marshall (born 1991), American rapper professionally known as Quavo
Robert Marshall (disambiguation), multiple people, including
Robert G. Marshall (born 1944), American politician
Roger Marshall (disambiguation), multiple people
Scott Marshall (footballer) (born 1973)
Shaun Marshall (born 1978), English football goalkeeper
Shona Marshall, Scottish sport shooter
Stephen Marshall (disambiguation), multiple people
J. Stewart Marshall (1911–1992), Canadian physicist and meteorologist
S. L. A. Marshall (1900–1977), aka "Slam" Marshall, American historian
Terrace Marshall Jr. (born 2000), American football player
Thomas Marshall (disambiguation), multiple people
Timothy P. Marshall (born 1956), American civil engineer and meteorologist
Thurgood Marshall (1908–1993), Associate Justice of the U.S. Supreme Court
Tony Marshall (disambiguation), multiple people
Trey Marshall (born 1996), American football player
Vanessa Marshall (born 1969), American voice actress
Walter Marshall (disambiguation), multiple people, including
Walter Marshall, Baron Marshall of Goring (1932–1996), British nuclear physicist
Whit Marshall (born 1973), American football player
William Marshall (disambiguation), multiple people

People with Marshall as given name
Marshall Allman (born 1984), American actor
Marshall Applewhite (1931–1997), cult leader
Marshall Bang, American singer, known as MRSHLL
Marshall Bell (born 1942), American actor
Marshall Brain (born 1961), American founder of HowStuffWorks.com
Marshall Brickman (born 1939), American screenwriter
Marshall Claxton (1811–1881), English painter
Marshall "Eddie" Conway (1946-2023), American black nationalist
Marshall Cousins (1869–1939), American businessman, politician, and historian
Marshall Crenshaw (born 1953), American pop musician
Marshall Faulk (born 1973), American football player
Marshall Goldberg (1917–2006), American NFL All-Pro football halfback 
Marshall Lee Gore (1963–2013), American murderer and rapist
Marshall Henderson (born 1990), American basketball player
James Marshall Hendrix (1942–1970), American rock musician, known as Jimi Hendrix
Marshall Holman (born 1954), American ten-pin bowler
Marshall Kent (actor) (1908–1985), American actor
Marshall Kent (bowler) (born 1992), American ten-pin bowler
Marshall Lancaster (born 1974), English actor, best known as DC Chris Skelton in Life on Mars
Marshall Loeb (born 1929), American financial author
Marshall Long (1936–2018), American businessman and politician
Marshall Bruce Mathers III (born 1972), American rapper, known as Eminem
Marshall Fletcher McCallie (born 1945), American diplomat
Marshall Kirk McKusick (born 1954), American computer scientist
Marshall McLuhan (1911–1980), Canadian educator, author, and media scholar
Marshall Perron (born 1942), Chief Minister of the Northern Territory of Australia
Marshall Warren Nirenberg (1927-2010), American biochemist and geneticist, Nobel laureate.
Marshall Rosenberg (1934–2015), American psychologist
Marshall Rosenbluth (1927–2003), American physicist
Marshall Vian Summers (born 1949), American prophet
Marshall Teague (racing driver) (1921–1959), American race-car driver
Marshall Teague (actor) (born 1953), American actor
Marshall Stanley Uwom (born 1965), Commissioner, Rivers State Ministry of Agriculture, Nigeria

People with Marshall as middle name
Bartlett Marshall Low (1839-1893), American businessman and politician

Fictional people named Marshall
Marshall of PAW Patrol
Marshall Eriksen of How I Met Your Mother
Marshall Law (Tekken) (fictional character in Tekken fighting games)
Marshall Lee of Adventure Time

See also
Marshal (surname)

English-language surnames
English masculine given names
Given names originating from a surname
Occupational surnames
English-language occupational surnames